Forrester Harvey (27 June 1884 – 14 December 1945) was an Irish film actor.

From 1922 until his death year Harvey appeared in more than 115 films. He was credited for about two-thirds of his film appearances, but some of his roles were uncredited. The burly actor with a mustache mostly played comic supporting roles, often as an innkeeper. His best-known role was Beamish in the first two Tarzan films starring Johnny Weissmuller.  Together with Claude Rains, he played in The Invisible Man, as a tavern owner and husband of a hysterical Una O'Connor, and in The Wolf Man. He appeared in two films for Alfred Hitchcock, first in his British silent film The Ring (1927), later in Hitchcock's Hollywood debut Rebecca (1940). A number of reference works incorrectly identify him as having played Little Maria's father in Frankenstein. Harvey's interment was in California.

Selected filmography

 The Lilac Sunbonnet (1922) as Jock Gordon
 Somebody's Darling (1925) as Oliver Jordan
 Nell Gwyn (1926) as Charles Hart
 If Youth But Knew (1926) as Amos
 The Ring (1927) as The Promoter
 The Flag Lieutenant (1927) as Dusty Miller
 The White Sheik (1928) as Pat
 Moulin Rouge (1928) as Tourist (uncredited)
 Toni (1928) as Watts
 Glorious Youth (1928) as Simmons
 Spangles (1928) as Watty
 Ringing the Changes (1929) as Steve Blower
 The Devil to Pay! (1930) as Taxi Driver (uncredited)
 A Tailor Made Man (1931) as Pomeroy
 The Man in Possession (1931) as A Bailiff
 Chances (1931) as Joe - News Vendor (uncredited)
 Guilty Hands (1931) as Spencer Wilson
 Devotion (1931) as Gas Inspector (uncredited)
 Lovers Courageous (1932) as Fisherman (uncredited)
 Shanghai Express (1932) as Peiping Ticket Agent (uncredited)
 Sky Devils (1932) as Innkeeper
 The Wet Parade (1932) as Mr. Fortesque
 Tarzan the Ape Man (1932) as Beamish
 But the Flesh Is Weak (1932) as Gooch
 Mystery Ranch (1932) as Artie Brower
 Those We Love (1932) as Jake
 Smilin' Through (1932) as Orderly
 Kongo (1932) as Cookie
 Red Dust (1932) as Captain Limey
 Destination Unknown (1933) as Ring
 The Eagle and the Hawk (1933) as Hogan
 Cocktail Hour (1933) as Barfly (uncredited)
 Midnight Club (1933) as Thomas Roberts
 Blind Adventure (1933) as Coffee Shop Owner
 Lady for a Day (1933) as Oscar, Hotel Employee with letter (uncredited)
 The Invisible Man (1933) as Herbert Hall
 Man of Two Worlds (1934) as Tim
 You Can't Buy Everything (1934) as Tramp in Park (uncredited)
 The Mystery of Mr. X (1934) as Joseph Horatio Palmer
 Tarzan and His Mate (1934) as Beamish
 Great Expectations (1934) as Uncle Pumblechook
 Menace (1934) as Wilcox
 The Painted Veil (1934) as Waddington
 Broadway Bill (1934) as Bradshaw (uncredited)
 Limehouse Blues (1934) as McDonald (uncredited)
 Forsaking All Others (1934) (scenes deleted)
 The Best Man Wins (1935) as Harry
 The Gilded Lily (1935) as Hugo / Innkeeper
 The Right to Live (1935) as English Bobby (uncredited)
 The Mystery of Edwin Drood (1935) as Durdles
 The Woman in Red (1935) as Mooney
 Vagabond Lady (1935) as Corky Nye
 China Seas (1935) as Chief Steward Ted Gary (uncredited)
 Jalna (1935) as Rags, the Butler-Chauffeur
 Without Regret (1935) as Police Surgeon (uncredited)
 The Perfect Gentleman (1935) as Wally Baxton
 A Tale of Two Cities (1935) as Joe (uncredited)
 Captain Blood (1935) as Honesty Nuttall
 Three Live Ghosts (1936) as The Paymaster (uncredited)
 Love Before Breakfast (1936) as Chief Steward
 Petticoat Fever (1936) as Scotty
 Trouble for Two (1936) as Hotel Waiter (uncredited)
 The Return of Sophie Lang (1936) as Deck Steward (uncredited)
 Suzy (1936) as Counter Man (uncredited)
 Lloyd's of London (1936) as Percival Potts
 White Hunter (1936) as Pembrooke
 Personal Property (1937) as Herbert Jenkins, Bailiff
 The Prince and the Pauper (1937) as Meaty Man
 Souls at Sea (1937) as Pub Proprietor (uncredited)
 The Man Who Cried Wolff (1937) as Jocko
 Bulldog Drummond Comes Back (1937) as Barman/Landlord (uncredited)
 Fight for Your Lady (1937) as Referee
 Thoroughbreds Don't Cry (1937) as Wilkins
 Bulldog Drummond's Peril (1938) as Bus Garage Man (uncredited)
 Kidnapped (1938) as Innkeeper
 Bulldog Drummond in Africa (1938) as Constable Jenkins (uncredited)
 Mysterious Mr. Moto (1938) as George Higgins
 Arrest Bulldog Drummond (1938) as Constable Severn--Outside Gannett House (uncredited)
 A Christmas Carol (1938) as Old Fezziwig (uncredited)
 Sweethearts (1938) as Tailor's Assistant (uncredited)
 I'm from Missouri (1939) as Customs Inspector (uncredited)
 Bulldog Drummond's Secret Police (1939) as Professor Downie
 Let Us Live (1939) as Death Row Inmate Asking for His Music (uncredited)
 The Lady's from Kentucky (1939) as Nonny Watkins
 The Witness Vanishes  (1939) as Allistair McNab
 The Private Lives of Elizabeth and Essex (1939) as Bit Part (uncredited)
 Raffles (1939) as Umpire (uncredited)
 The Invisible Man Returns (1940) as Ben Jenkins
 A Chump at Oxford (1940) as Meredith
 Rebecca (1940) as Chalcroft
 On Their Own (1940) as Mr. Pim
 Tom Brown's School Days (1940) as Sam. the Coachman (uncredited)
 Earl of Puddlestone (1940) as Tittington
 Little Nellie Kelly (1940) as Moriarity
 Free and Easy (1941) as Briggs (Landlord)
 Meet John Doe (1941) as Bum (uncredited)
 Scotland Yard (1941) as Air Raid Warden (uncredited)
 Dr. Jekyll and Mr. Hyde (1941) as Old Prouty
 The Feminine Touch (1941) (scenes deleted)
 Mercy Island (1941) as Captain Lowe
 The Wolf Man (1941) as Twiddle
 This Above All (1942) as Proprietor (uncredited)
 Mrs. Miniver (1942) as Mr. Huggins (uncredited)
 Random Harvest (1942) as Cabby (uncredited)
 The Mysterious Doctor (1943) as Hugh Penhryn
 The Lodger (1944) as Cobbler (uncredited)
 Secrets of Scotland Yard (1944) as Alfred Morgan
 None but the Lonely Heart (1944) as Shooting Galley Proprietor (uncredited)
 The Man in Half Moon Street (1945) as Harris, Cabby (uncredited)
 Scotland Yard Investigator (1945) as Sam Todworthy
 Confidential Agent (1945) as Bates (uncredited)
 The Green Years (1946) as Peter Dickie (uncredited)
 Devotion (1946) as Hoggs (uncredited)

References

External links
 
 
 

1884 births
1945 deaths
Irish male film actors
Irish male silent film actors
People from County Cork
20th-century Irish male actors
Irish expatriate male actors in the United States